Street Sharks  is an American superhero animated series about the adventures of crime-fighting half-man/half-sharks. It was produced by DIC Productions, L.P. and Bohbot Entertainment, and aired from 1994 to 1997, originally as a part of Bohbot's Amazin' Adventures programming block. before moving to ABC for its final season. The show promoted a line of action figures by Mattel. The creators were David Siegel and Joe Galliani of Mr. Joe's Really Big Productions.

In 1996, the Street Sharks were paired with the Dino Vengers and the show was retitled Dino Vengers Featuring Street Sharks.

The series features theme music by Michael Benghiat and Lois Blaisch. Additional songs were written by Megan Cavallari and David Goldsmith.

Plot
A university professor named Dr. Robert Bolton and his partner Dr. Luther Paradigm create a machine known as the "gene-slammer" which is capable of changing aquatic animals into anthropomorphic hybrids by combining their DNA. In his attempt to prevent Paradigm from using this machine for personal power, Bolton is transformed into an unseen monstrosity, but escapes. Later, Paradigm gives Bolton's four sons John, Bobby, Coop, and Clint the likeness of four different sharks. When Dr. Paradigm captures their friend Bends, the resulting "Street Sharks" rescue him and the resulting battle causes Paradigm to be combined with piranha DNA (for which he is often nicknamed "Dr. Piranoid" by other characters). In subsequent episodes, Dr. Paradigm creates a variety of mutant animals to destroy the Street Sharks while attempting to persuade the inhabitants of their native metropolis of Fission City to imprison them. Of these mutant animals, a few sided with the Sharks themselves: namely Rox, Moby Lick, Mantaman, and El Swordo.

The final few episodes introduced the Dino Vengers: a group of extraterrestrial dinosaurs allied with the Street Sharks against their own rivals in the Raptor Gang. When Dr. Paradigm wanted to get a sample of the Raptors' DNA to improve himself, they trick him by giving him iguana DNA which transforms him into "Dr. Iguanazoid" leading to him working with the Raptors where they will reward him by correcting the DNA mistake they gave him. In the end, Paradigm is captured and imprisoned while the Raptor Gang leaves Earth.

The Dino Vengers later had their own series called Extreme Dinosaurs where they and the Raptors had different backgrounds.

Characters

Bolton family

 Ripster (voiced by Lee Tockar) – John Bolton is the smartest, the leader, and oldest of the four brothers who enjoys creating inventions. He has taken up most of his knowledge and skills from his father. He is also an avid pool player. In the first episode of the show, John rides a motorbike. When transformed into Ripster, he becomes a great white shark able to bite through steel, as well as having extrasensory abilities.
 Jab (voiced by Matt Hill) – Clint Bolton is the laziest of the Street Sharks, but enjoys boxing and appears to have some talent with mechanics. When transformed into Jab, he becomes a hammerhead shark and uses his head as a battering ram.
 Streex (voiced by Andrew Rannells) – Robert "Bobby" Bolton Jr. is a level-headed, cool and self-proclaimed ladies' man. He is always shown wearing his rollerblades and appears to enjoy parachuting and snowboarding and later plays drums professionally. When transformed into Streex, he becomes a tiger shark, named after the purple streaks on his body. In the toyline, he was originally called "Blades" for his skills as a rollerblader.
 Big Slammu (voiced by D. Kevin Williams) – Coop Bolton is the strongest and youngest of the four. He is also a football player in high school. In the first episode, he uses a skateboard. When transformed into Big Slammu, he becomes a whale shark and his most prominent maneuver is the "Seismic Slam" in which he may shake or crack the ground with his fists.
 Dr. Robert Bolton (voiced by D. Kevin Williams) – a university professor and the father of the Bolton Brothers who invents the gene-manipulation device for peaceful uses. He is only seen on-screen in the first episode where he tries to stop Dr. Paradigm's experiments only to become changed into an unseen inhuman creature. Afterward, he is only ever represented by a shadow cast on the wall (either as a humanoid or as an animal-like monstrosity). It is suggested through the series that Dr. Bolton secretly assists his sons. The episode "Shark Source" shows him defeating Dr. Piranoid to rescue a kidnapped mutant crocodile. Despite the fact that he helps them, Dr. Bolton is never reunited with his sons. However, he does contact his sons through a TV screen where the transmission keeps even the viewers from seeing his current appearance.
 Sir Thomas Bolton - an ancestor of the protagonists who is encountered in the episode "Sir Shark-a-Lot". He is the target of Paradigm's time-travel excursion to destroy the Bolton family.

Allies
 Lena Mack (voiced by Pam Carter) – a student of Dr. Paradigm's who suspects him of crime, and therefore assists the Street Sharks. She is later reduced to a background role and has a younger brother named Malik.
 Bends (voiced by Jim Hoggatt) – Fission University's technical genius and a source of comic relief who supplies the Street Sharks with their motorbikes and weapons and conceals them underneath the University's ice skating rink. In episode 16, it is revealed that he cannot be mutated by a gene-slamming airborne virus. This genetic trait was passed down to his great, great, great grandson who is a member of the resistance against Dr. Paradigm in an alternate future as seen in "Shark to the Future".
 Moby Lick – Jets Taylor is a good friend of the Bolton Brothers and Bends. Under Dr. Paradigm's mind-control, Jets is combined with a killer whale by Dr. Paradigm in order to make him his latest Seaviate. Becoming Moby Lick, he later broke free of Paradigm's mind control and became an ally of the Street Sharks. Moby Lick has a long prehensile tongue (the source of his name), great strength, the ability to inhale water and expel it through his blowhole, and later demonstrated the ability to communicate with other killer whales. In "Shark Hunt", Moby became an eco-conservationist in the Everglades National Park.
 Rox (voiced by Lee Tockar) – Melvin Kresnik is an up-and-coming musician mistakenly combined with a bull shark who exposes Dr. Paradigm's plan to change Kresnik's audience into mutants. Thereafter, Rox continues as a rock star by explaining his altered form as a costume and remains a friend of the Sharks. In the toyline, Rox is labelled as a mako shark instead of a bull shark. He was dropped from the series after Season Two.
 President David Horne (voiced by Tony Wike) – the President of the United States. The Street Sharks save him from Dr. Paradigm before he can be "gene washed" like he did with Vice-President Russell. Following this incident, President Horne secretly leaks information to the Street Sharks.
 El Swordo (voiced by Garry Chalk) – a circus performer who worked with a large marlin named Spike. The two were eventually "fused" together by Dr. Paradigm resulting in a combination of memories under the man's personality. El Swordo remains active in entertainment as a professional swordsman.
 Mantaman (voiced by D. Kevin Williams) – a flying dinosaur-like alien specimen was found encased in stone by Dr. Terrence "Terry" Morton and reactivated by Dr. Paradigm. Dr. Morton then deliberately gene-slammed himself with a combination of the alien's DNA and manta ray DNA to help the Street Sharks fight the original alien. He has a younger brother named Ryan who appears in "Shark Jacked" when he gets captured by Dr. Paradigm. By the end of the episode, Mantaman's parents learn of what became of their son and accept his appearance. Around the "Ancient Sharkonauts" episode, Mantaman returns under the control of the Raptors when it was revealed that they were behind the flying dinosaur-like alien whose DNA is part of Mantaman. He is later liberated by the Street Sharks.
 The Dino Vengers – a military unit from an exoplanet inhabited by anthropomorphic dinosaurs, who later allied with the Street Sharks. Once ordinary members of their race, the four volunteered to receive genetic enhancements that made them far larger and stronger to better combat Bad Rap and his gang of terrorists. 
 T-Bone (voiced by Ian James Corlett) – a Tyrannosaurus and the leader of the Dino Vengers.
 Stegz (voiced by D. Kevin Williams) – a Stegosaurus.
 Bullzeye (voiced by Jason Michas) – a Pteranodon.
 Spike (voiced by Garry Chalk) – a Triceratops.

Antagonists
 Dr. Luther Paradigm (voiced by J. Michael Lee) – the main antagonist of the series and arch-enemy of the Street Sharks. A professor at Fission City University, he is easily identified by his metal eyepatch and later by a giant yellow robotic exoskeleton, with offensive capabilities including the ability to fire harpoons. In the second episode, Dr. Paradigm is injected with piranha DNA meant for Bends as the Street Sharks nicknamed him Dr. Piranoid. Afterwards, Paradigm's face assumes inhuman attributes at moments of strong emotion. When in public, Dr. Paradigm wears a robe to hide his exoskeleton. When Dr. Bolton defeated Dr. Piranoid to rescue a captive mutant crocodile and damaged his armor, it was shown that parts of his body were piranha-like. During episodes featuring the Dino-Vengers, Dr. Paradigm injected himself with iguana DNA which was given to him by the Raptors instead of Velociraptor DNA and was renamed Dr. Iguanazoid by the Street Sharks as a result. He has since helped out the Raptors with their plots hoping that they will actually give him Velociraptor DNA. By "Shark-apolypse Now!", Dr. Iguanazoid is apprehended by the Street Sharks.
 SharkBot (voiced by Steve Gibbs) – a product of Dr. Paradigm's experimentation with robotics. It was used to free the monster Repteel from prison and frame the Street Sharks for the crime. The Sharks ultimately reprogrammed SharkBot to destroy Paradigm's laboratory. SharkBot was later rebuilt into SharkBot 2.0 which fought the Street Sharks until the end of the series' second season.
 Tentakill – a biped creature of unknown origins and species, first seen in the episode "Sir Shark-a-Lot" as Paradigm's newest weapon. It is incapable of speech, shows limited intelligence, and was not utilized often.
 Seaviates – a group of mutant sea creatures that serve Dr. Paradigm.
 Slobster (voiced by D. Kevin Williams) – a lobster injected with the DNA of Genghis Khan and Thomas Blood. He and Slash only appear in season one (although they still appear in the opening credits).
 Slash (voiced by Terry Berner) – a swordfish injected with the DNA of villains like Genghis Khan and Thomas Blood like Slobster. Thus, he becomes an anthropomorphic swordfish with a drill bit on its nose who speaks in a hissing lisp. Slash is usually defeated by the immobilization of his nasal drill. He and Slobster only appear in season one (although they still appear in the opening credits).
 Killamari (voiced by D. Kevin Williams) – an anthropomorphic squid that is able to project natural "spears" or "harpoons" from his mouth and the many suckers covering his body. In the episode "Lone Shark", he almost kills Jab with his venom. Lena and Bends concoct an anti-venom which has since reduced his threat.
 Repteel (voiced by Tony Wike) – the only one of Dr. Paradigm's Seaviates to have originally been human. Mr. Cunneyworth is the aged owner and hotel manager of a run-down hotel accidentally demolished by the Street Sharks during a fight with Dr. Paradigm's Seaviates. As he had nowhere else to go, Mr. Cunneyworth willingly allowed Dr. Paradigm to merge his genetic codes with those of a moray eel and an electric eel. As Repteel, he feeds on electricity and shoots miniature eels (also charged with electricity) from his hands and wears a special pack to store energy.
 Shrimp Louie (voiced by Andrew Rannells) – a mutated shrimp and one of Paradigm's later Seaviates, although it is unclear if he was human first or not. He is not very strong, is quite the coward, and his primary weapons are big blaster guns. He only appears in seasons 2 and 3.
 Maximillian Greco – an aged mafioso who blackmails Dr. Paradigm into using the Genetic Engineering Chamber to gene-slam him with the DNA of a rhinoceros (upon its nose-hair samples being obtained) and the DNA of a desert tortoise upon learning of his illegal and secret experiments. This granted Greco with the strength of a rhinoceros and the longevity of a desert tortoise which rejuvenated Greco to half his real age. He later resurfaced as the owner of a casino.
 Zeus and Apollo (vocal effects provided by D. Kevin Williams) – Maximillian Greco's pet Chihuahuas. Like their owner, they were also genetically enhanced by Dr. Paradigm which made them larger than normal.
 Malcolm Medusa III (voiced by J. Michael Lee) – a rich, business-owning big game hunter who frequently targets endangered animals. The Street Sharks and Moby Lick expose him. In "Shark Hunt", Malcolm Medusa III traps Moby Lick and the Street Sharks in a hunting enclosure. He is eventually imprisoned in an island prison as he plans his revenge.
 Clammando (voiced by D. Kevin Williams) – a mutant clam who is Malcolm Medusa III's right-hand man. He started out as a dock worker for Malcolm Medusa III who fell into a toxic waste part of the water where there were clams. As a result upon being fished out by Malcolm, he turned into a mutant clam. In "Shark to the Future", Clammando's appearance was first used as a Seaviate that worked for Dr. Paradigm during the Street Sharks' visit to the future.
 Dr. Tecno-Piranoid  (voiced by J. Michael Lee) – a future counterpart of Dr. Paradigm. He is more evil and quite possibly more powerful than the present day version. Dr. Tecno-Piranoid first appears in the episode "Shark to the Future" when the Street Sharks visit his timeline. In "Shark Wars", Dr. Tecno-Piranoid appears in the present to collaborate with his present day counterpart to make sure an event that led to his future remains intact. Like how Paradigm has SharkBots serving him, this version has MechoSharks as his mechanical army. When the Street Sharks foiled the plot, Dr. Tecno-Piranoid vanished when his future was rewritten.
 MechoSharks – Dr. Tecno-Piranoid's army of mechanized shark monsters.
 The Raptors – a trio of rogue Velociraptor-like criminals who come from the same exoplanet as the Dino Vengers.
 Bad Rap (voiced by Doug Parker) – the leader of the Raptors who has a metal brace-like device on his mouth and a rocket launcher on his right hand.
 Haxx (voiced by Doug Parker) – a Raptor with implants on the backs of each wrist that produce green blades. His tail has been replaced with a blade capable of spinning like a drill.
 Spittor (voiced by Doug Parker) – the scientist and brains of the Raptors. Spittor carries a tank with various liquids released from nozzles on his hands, tail, and mouth.

Recurring characters
 Guy in the Sky (voiced by Tony Wike) – Fission City's top air radio reporter and paparazzo. He was never fully seen, but recognized by a yellow helicopter. The Guy in the Sky was later dropped from the show after first season.
 Detective Michael Brock – the police detective who investigates the Sharks' activities. He was later dropped from the show after first season.
 Mayor Neutrino - the African-American mayor of Fission City.
 Danielle Lafon - Fission City's news reporter.

Series overview

Episodes

Season 1 (1994)

Season 2 (1995)

Season 3 (1996–97)
The third season of the series received a retooling, introducing a fellow team of characters titled the Dino Vengers. This season aired on ABC's Saturday-morning cartoon block during the fall of 1996.

Home video releases

United States
In 1995, Buena Vista Home Video released a VHS titled The Gene Slamming Begins, which featured the first 3 episodes of Season 1: "Sharkbait", "Sharkbite" and "Sharkstorm" combined into a feature-length format. Buena Vista followed this release with two tapes featuring Season 1 episodes: "Shark Quest", which had the episodes "Shark Quest" and "Lone Shark", and the other: "Shark 'n' Roll" which featured the episodes "Shark 'n' Roll" and "Fresh Water Shark". Unusually, these releases were branded as regular BVHV releases rather than being released under the DIC Toon-Time Video label, unlike other DIC VHS's released by the company at the time.

In 2012, Mill Creek Entertainment acquired the rights to release the series on DVD. They released Street Sharks - The Complete Series on DVD in Region 1 for the very first time in February 2013. Mill Creek Entertainment re-released the complete series on DVD in Region 1 five years later in January.

Discotek Media released the series on SD Blu-ray under license from 41 Entertainment and Invincible Entertainment Partners on March 29, 2022. This was Discotek Media's first release of a Western animated series that is not based on a video game.

United Kingdom
In 1996, BMG Video released three VHS tapes in the United Kingdom, featuring the same episodes as the U.S. VHS's, although the first tape was retitled as Jawsome!.

In 2004, Anchor Bay U.K. released a single-DVD/VHS volume featuring the first 4 episodes.

In 2005, Avenue Entertainment released two DVD volumes containing two episodes each: Volume 1 featured "Sharkbite" and "Shark Fight" and Volume 2 featured "Sky Sharks" and "Shark of Steel".

Tie-in products
In 1996, Archie Comics released a short-lived comic book series based on Street Sharks. They published a three-issue miniseries which was based on the first three episodes of the series, and a regular comic series, which lasted three issues.

From 1994 to 1997, Mattel released a line of Street Sharks action figures.

See also
 List of anthropomorphic animal superheroes
 Extreme Dinosaurs – a spin-off TV series
 Teenage Mutant Ninja Turtles (1987 TV series)

References

External links
 
 Official website (via Internet Archive)
 Street Sharks at the Big Cartoon Database

1990s American animated television series
1990s American science fiction television series
1994 American television series debuts
1997 American television series endings
American children's animated action television series
American children's animated adventure television series
American children's animated science fantasy television series
Animated television series about fish
Discotek Media
Fictional sharks
First-run syndicated television programs in the United States
Superhero teams
1990s toys
Television series by DIC Entertainment
USA Action Extreme Team
English-language television shows
Television shows based on Mattel toys
Television series about mutants